Makoto Douglas Sakamoto (born April 8, 1947) is a retired Japanese-born American artistic gymnast and coach. He competed at the 1964 and 1972 Summer Olympics with the best individual result of 17th place on parallel bars in 1972. Domestically he won the AAU titles in the all-around and horizontal bar in 1963, in the all-around in 1964, and in all seven events in 1965.

Sakamoto was born in 1947 in Shinjuku, Tokyo, Japan, and in 1955 his family moved to California, U.S. After receiving B.A. and M.A. degrees in coaching he worked as assistant coach at UCLA in 1976–1984. His trainees included Peter Vidmar and Tim Daggett. After that he worked for the New South Wales Gymnastics Association in Sydney, Australia in 1984–1987, and between 1987 and 2000 he was head coach at Brigham Young University. Sakamoto was assistant coach for the American teams that competed at the 1984 Summer Olympics and 1981 and 1983 world championships. He is married to Masako Yoshisa and has two children. In 1986 he was inducted into the U.S. Gymnastics Hall of Fame.

References

1947 births
Living people
Gymnasts at the 1964 Summer Olympics
Gymnasts at the 1972 Summer Olympics
Olympic gymnasts of the United States
American male artistic gymnasts
Universiade bronze medalists for the United States
Universiade medalists in gymnastics
Medalists at the 1965 Summer Universiade
USC Trojans athletes